In 4-dimensional geometry, the tetrahedral bipyramid is the direct sum of a tetrahedron and a segment, {3,3} + { }. Each face of a central tetrahedron is attached with two tetrahedra, creating 8 tetrahedral cells, 16 triangular faces, 14 edges, and 6 vertices,. A tetrahedral bipyramid can be seen as two tetrahedral pyramids augmented together at their base.

It is the dual of a tetrahedral prism, so it can also be given a Coxeter-Dynkin diagram, and both have Coxeter notation symmetry [2,3,3], order 48.

Being convex with all regular cells (tetrahedra) means that it is a Blind polytope.

This bipyramid exists as the cells of the dual of the uniform rectified 5-simplex, and rectified 5-cube or the dual of any uniform 5-polytope with a tetrahedral prism vertex figure. And, as well, it exists as the cells of the dual to the rectified 24-cell honeycomb.

See also
 Triangular bipyramid - A lower dimensional analogy of the tetrahedral bipyramid.
 Octahedral bipyramid - A lower symmetry form of the as 16-cell.
 Cubic bipyramid
 Dodecahedral bipyramid
 Icosahedral bipyramid

References

 

4-polytopes